Seth Adam Howard (born March 17, 1974) is an American politician from Maryland from the Republican Party. He is currently a member of the Maryland House of Delegates from District 30B, representing Anne Arundel County.

Early life and career
Howard was born in Cheverly, Maryland on March 17, 1974. He attended Glenelg High School in Glenelg, Maryland. He served in the United States Marine Corps from 1994 to 1998, and in the Maryland Army National Guard from 1999 to 2003. Since 2004, he has owned the Broadleaf Tobacco and Smoke Shop in Severna Park, Maryland. He is currently a member of the South County Future Farmers of America, the Greater Severna Park Chamber of Commerce, the Southern Anne Arundel Chamber of Commerce, and the Business and Community Advisory Board for Southern High School.

Howard ran for the Maryland House of Delegates in 2014, seeking to succeed delegate Robert Costa, who announced his intent to retire after redistricting moved him to District 33B. During the primary, the National Rifle Association endorsed his campaign with an 'AQ' rating. He defeated Anne Arundel County police lieutenant Jim Fredericks in the primary election, receiving 52 percent of the vote.

In the legislature
Howard was sworn into the House of Delegates on January 14, 2015. He has served as the Deputy Minority Whip for the Maryland House Republican Caucus since 2021, filling a vacancy left by the election of Delegate Christopher T. Adams to serve as the House Minority Whip.

In January 2020, the American Conservative Union gave Howard a score of 63 percent, making him the lowest-scoring Republican in the Maryland House of Delegates.

In 2020, Howard was an alternate delegate for the Republican Party National Convention.

Committee assignments
 Economic Matters Committee, 2015–present (unemployment insurance subcommittee, 2015–2017; consumer protection & commercial law subcommittee, 2015–2018; business regulation subcommittee, 2015–present; alcoholic beverages subcommittee, 2017–present; banking, consumer protection & commercial law subcommittee, 2019–2020; public utilities subcommittee, 2021–present)

Other memberships
 Anne Arundel County Delegation, 2015–present (county subcommittee, 2015–present; education subcommittee, 2015–present; alcoholic beverages subcommittee, 2015–present)
 Maryland Legislative Sportsmen's Caucus, 2015–present
 Maryland Veterans Caucus, 2015–present

Electoral history

References

Living people
1974 births
Republican Party members of the Maryland House of Delegates
People from Cheverly, Maryland
21st-century American politicians